Uropetala carovei (New Zealand bush giant dragonfly) is a giant dragonfly of the family Petaluridae, endemic to New Zealand. Its Māori name, kapokapowai (or kapowai) means "water snatcher", alluding to the water dwelling juvenile stage (nymph), which, like all dragonflies, has a long extendable jaw that shoots out to snatch prey. It is also known as Carové's Giant Dragonfly.

Description 

Females are slightly larger than males. The bodies of both the female and male are dark brown, with pale spots on the abdomen and thorax. Males have petal-shaped appendages at the tip of the abdomen. Uropetala carovei can be distinguished from the similar Uropetala chiltoni, which occurs in the mountains of the South Island, by its all-black labrum (lacking the large pale blotch on Uropetala chiltoni), and its brown to yellowish leg femur segments (which are black in Uropetala chiltoni).

Taxonomy
Uropetala carovei was first described by Adam White (White and Doubleday 1846). The Natural History Museum, London holds the type material (Rowe 1987).

Distribution and habitat 
This species is found throughout New Zealand, mostly in western parts of each island, and especially on the West Coast. They are found in damp areas of native forest.

Breeding 
Breeding takes place on the banks of forest streams, or near springs. Males establish and aggressively defend territories during the breeding season. After copulation takes place, the female lays eggs on shaded banks of streams, and attaches eggs to clumps of moss, using her ovipositor.

The larval stage (nymph or naiad) tunnels into the soft earth of a stream bank or seepage, where they occupy a chamber half-filled with water for about five years. They emerge at night to seek prey near the burrow entrance. They are sensitive to disturbance so are rarely observed.

Prey and predators 
Adults feed on smaller insects, including butterflies, cicadas and wasps which they can eat on the wing.

The nymph stage of U. carovei is preyed on by weka and feral cats. Adults are predated by rats, kingfishers.

Conservation status 
As of 2018, the New Zealand Threat Classification System lists the status of Uropetala carovei as Not Threatened. Its IUCN status is Least Concern.

In Māori culture 

The Ngāti Rongomai iwi of the Rotorua region have a special association with the kapokapowai through oral history that describes huge numbers of dragonflies coming to the aid of a leader Rakeiao, and helping him defeat enemies in battle by flying into the faces, eyes and noses of his opponents.

References

External links 

 Uropetala dragonflies discussed on RNZ Critter of the Week, 16 September 2016

Petaluridae
Odonata of New Zealand
Insects described in 1846
Endemic fauna of New Zealand
Endemic insects of New Zealand